Milestone Returns or Earth-M is an ongoing line of American comic books published by DC Comics that began in September 2020.

The line features reimagined versions of the fictional characters and shared universe of Milestone Media by Denys Cowan, Michael Davis, Derek T. Dingle and Dwayne McDuffie.

Publication history 
In 2018, DC Comics announced Earth-M as a reboot of several comic books of Milestone Media by Denys Cowan, Michael Davis, Derek T. Dingle and Dwayne McDuffie.

In 2020, Earth-M was retitled as Milestone Returns, with the initial issue being published in September. An extended version was published in February 2021.

The issues are available in print, digitally, and on DC Universe Infinite since April 2021.

Setting 
Milestone Returns is set in "Earth-M", which is officially non-canon to the DC Universe.

Premise 
In Earth-M, famous characters like Static, Icon, Rocket, Hardware and several others have new origin stories related to the Big Bang, the event that happened in the city of Dakota. While they still do not know each other, the enigmatic Dharma prepares them in secret for a war to come.

List of titles

Prelude

Year 1

Year 2

Year 3

Crossover event 

 "Worlds Collide" — A reboot of the 1994 original storyline split into three acts:
 Icon vs. Hardware #1–5

Collected editions

References 

2020 comics debuts
Comic book reboots
DC Comics storylines
Milestone Comics
Superhero comics